The Mitti Dam is a concrete and earthen dam built on the Mitti River in Abdasa Taluka, Kutch District, Gujarat, India. The dam is located near the village of Trambau and was completed in 1983. The dam is 4405 m long, and has 17.40 million cubic metres (MCM) of gross storage, 2.68 MCM of dead storage, and 14.72 MCM of live storage capacity.

Notes

Further reading
 

Dams in Gujarat
Tourist attractions in Kutch district
Dams completed in 1983
Earth-filled dams
1983 establishments in Gujarat
20th-century architecture in India